The Tierra Blanca Mountains are located in San Diego County in southern California between the Vallecito Mountains and the In-Ko-Pah Mountains. The range is located to the west of the community of Canebrake and the Carrizo Badlands.

References 

Mountain ranges of Southern California
Mountain ranges of San Diego County, California
Peninsular Ranges